The 2008–09 St. John's Red Storm men's basketball team represented St. John's University during the 2008–09 NCAA Division I men's basketball season. The team was coached by Norm Roberts in his fifth year at the school. St. John's home games are played at Carnesecca Arena and Madison Square Garden and the team is a member of the Big East Conference.

Off season

Departures

Class of 2008 signees

Roster

Schedule and results

|-
!colspan=9 style="background:#FF0000; color:#FFFFFF;"| Non-Conference Regular Season

|-
!colspan=9 style="background:#FF0000; color:#FFFFFF;"| Big East Conference Regular Season

|-
!colspan=9 style="background:#FF0000; color:#FFFFFF;"| Big East tournament

|-
!colspan=9 style="background:#FF0000; color:#FFFFFF;"| CBI Tournament

References

St. John's Red Storm men's basketball seasons
St. John's
St John
St John